The TivoliVredenburg is a contemporary music complex located in Utrecht, Netherlands. The venue consists of five halls designed acoustically for a specific music genre. Along with its hall, the venue also features an "amateur stage" and a cafe.

History
Designer Herman Hertzberger wanted to combine the atmosphere of the Tivoli Oudegracht and Muziekcentrum Vredenburg. All plans were approved by the city in 2010 and the Muziekcentrum Vredenburg was demolished in 2011 to make way for the new music venue.

The first event, an art exhibition, took place on 2 April 2014. The first concert was held in the Pandora hall on 5 April 2014 featuring: Adept, Tommy Four Seven, Pfirter and Abstract Division. Official opening ceremonies began on 27 June 2014, with the venue being inaugurated by King Willem-Alexander on 3 July 2014.

References

Music venues completed in 2014
2014 establishments in the Netherlands
Music venues in the Netherlands
Buildings and structures in Utrecht (city)
Contemporary music